Lithocarpus hatusimae is a tree in the beech family Fagaceae. It is named for the Japanese botanist Sumihiko Hatusima.

Description
The greyish brown bark is smooth or fissured.

Distribution and habitat
Lithocarpus hatusimae is endemic to Borneo.

References

hatusimae
Endemic flora of Borneo
Trees of Borneo
Plants described in 1970
Flora of the Borneo lowland rain forests
Flora of the Borneo montane rain forests